Acacia ulicina is a shrub of the genus Acacia and the subgenus Phyllodineae that is endemic to western Australia.

Description
It has striated branches that have a powdery white coating between the ribs. The branches divide down to many short, spinescent, aphyllous branchlets. It blooms from July to September and produces yellow flowers. The rudimentary inflorescences occur singly per raceme and have spherical to shortly obloid flower-heads with a diameter of  containing 15 to 25 golden flowers. The curved, coriaceous, dark brown seed pods that form after flowering and constricted between and the rounded over seeds.

Distribution
It is native to an area in the Wheatbelt and Mid West regions of Western Australia where it grows in gravelly lateritic clay-loam soils. The shrub is situated from around Kalbarri in the north and extends south east to around Tammin and Brookton.

See also
 List of Acacia species

References

ulicina
Acacias of Western Australia
Plants described in 1848
Taxa named by Carl Meissner